Richard Fallon may refer to:

Richard Fallon (police officer) (1926–1970), Irish police officer
Richard G. Fallon (1923–2013), American academic
Richard H. Fallon Jr. (born 1952), American legal scholar